Charlie's Angels is a 2000 American action comedy film directed by McG in his feature film directorial debut, and written by Ryan Rowe, Ed Solomon, and John August. It is the first installment in the Charlie's Angels film series, a continuation of the television series of the same name created by Ivan Goff and Ben Roberts, which is also a continuation of the series story. Unlike the original series, which had dramatic elements, the film features more comical elements.

It stars Cameron Diaz, Drew Barrymore, and Lucy Liu as three women working in a private detective agency in Los Angeles. John Forsythe reprised his role as the unseen Charlie's voice from the original series. Bill Murray also stars as John Bosley, replacing David Doyle who played the role in the original series. It also stars Sam Rockwell, Tim Curry and Kelly Lynch while Crispin Glover, Matt LeBlanc, Luke Wilson and Tom Green appear in supporting roles.

It was released on November 3, 2000, in the United States by Sony Pictures Releasing under its Columbia Pictures label, and has grossed $264 million worldwide. The film received mixed-to-positive reviews from critics, with praise for the performances of Diaz, Barrymore, Liu and Murray as well as its action sequences and humor, but criticisms aimed at the plot and "lack of originality".

Plot
Natalie Cook, Dylan Sanders, and Alex Munday are the "Angels", three talented, tough, attractive women who work as private investigators together for unseen millionaire Charlie Townsend. Charlie uses speakers in his offices to communicate with the Angels, and his assistant Bosley works with them directly when needed.

Charlie assigns the Angels to find Eric Knox, a software genius who created a revolutionary voice-recognition system and heads his own company, Knox Enterprises. He is believed to have been kidnapped by Roger Corwin, who runs a communications-satellite company called Redstar.

The Angels infiltrate a party held by Corwin and spot a suspicious-looking man that they had previously seen from surveillance videos of Knox's kidnapping. Dubbing him the "Thin Man", the Angels chase him down and fight him; he gets away, but the Angels find Knox, safely held nearby.

After the Angels reunite Knox with his business partner Vivian Wood, Charlie explains that they must determine whether the Thin Man has stolen Knox's voice-recognition software. The Angels infiltrate Redstar headquarters, fool the security system, and plant a device in the central computer that will enable them to explore it remotely. They retire for the night after giving Bosley the laptop computer that communicates with the Redstar computer.

Dylan takes up Knox's offer to spend the night with him, and they end up having sex. Afterwards, he betrays her; simultaneously, attacks are made on Natalie and Alex, Bosley is captured by Vivian, and Corwin is murdered by the Thin Man. Knox tells Dylan his kidnapping was all faked to get the Angels to help him access the Redstar satellite network. He plans to use it along with his voice recognition software to find and kill Charlie, who Knox asserts killed his father in the Vietnam War.

Dylan escapes and reunites with Natalie and Alex, who also survived their attacks. They approach Charlie's office just as the building explodes. They find a radio receiver that Bosley is able to communicate through via a tooth implanted radio transmitter. Bosley provides enough information of where he's captured to allow Natalie to deduce its location, an abandoned lighthouse. With help from Dylan's boyfriend Chad, the Angels stealthily approach it. Upon finding Knox, Dylan is captured by his henchmen, and is tied up and gagged.

The Angels are too late to stop Knox from determining Charlie's location, though they rescue Bosley while Dylan fights off her captors. They come together to defeat Vivian, the Thin Man, and other assorted henchmen, but Knox blows up the lighthouse and flies off in an attack helicopter towards Charlie's house. Bosley helps the Angels board it, where Alex reprograms the missile to have it shoot backwards; blowing up the helicopter and killing Knox while the Angels land safely.

Seeing the opportunity to finally meet Charlie in person, they enter the nearby beach house that Knox had targeted, but he has already left. He remotely congratulates the Angels on a job well done through another speaker, and treats them and Bosley to a vacation. Charlie also tells them that Knox's father was an undercover double agent; he was discovered and killed by the enemy, but not by Charlie.

When he speaks to the Angels by telephone on the beach, they ask if they could ever meet him in person. Dylan suspects she sees him nearby talking into a cell phone, but does not tell the group; opting to raise a toast to Charlie instead. Bosley playfully douses the Angels with his drink, and they chase him towards the ocean. From afar, a silhouetted Charlie watches them and walks off.

Cast

 Cameron Diaz as Natalie Cook
 Drew Barrymore as Dylan Sanders
 Lucy Liu as Alex Munday
 Bill Murray as John Bosley
 Sam Rockwell as Eric Knox
 Kelly Lynch as Vivian Wood
 Crispin Glover as the Thin Man, a mysterious assassin 
 Matt LeBlanc as Jason Gibbons, Alex's boyfriend
 Luke Wilson as Pete Kominsky, Natalie's love interest
 Tim Curry as Roger Corwin, head of communications-satellite company Redstar
 John Forsythe as the voice of Charles "Charlie" Townsend, the owner of the Townsend agency
 Tom Green as Chad, a fisherman whom Dylan is dating
 LL Cool J as Mr. Jones, Dylan's secret identity in the first scene
 Melissa McCarthy as Doris, a secretary at Redstar
 Sean Whalen as Pasqual, a terrorist 
 Karen McDougal as Roger Corwin's girlfriend

Production 
According to Thandiwe Newton, she was the original choice for Alex Munday, but declined as she did not want to be "objectified" or play racial stereotypes. The role ultimately went to Lucy Liu.

Reception

Box office
The film opened on November 3, 2000, earning $13.7 million in its opening day, debuting at the top of the box office. For its first weekend, the film grossed $40.1 million dethroning Meet the Parents, which had stayed at number-one for four weeks. Eventually, Charlie's Angels grossed a total of $125,305,545 domestically.

Against a budget of $93 million Charlie's Angels grossed $125.3 million in North America and $148.8 million in other territories, for a worldwide gross of $264.1 million, making it the 12th highest-grossing film of 2000.

Critical response
On Rotten Tomatoes, the film has a 68% approval rating based on 146 reviews, with an average rating of 6.20/10. The site's critical consensus reads: "Mixing tongue-in-cheek cheesecake with glossy action set pieces, Charlie's Angels is slick and reasonably fun despite its lack of originality". On Metacritic, which assigns a weighted average score, it has a score of 52 out of 100 based on reviews from 34 critics, indicating "mixed or average reviews".

David Edelstein for Slate, wrote, despite expecting to hate the film, he found he loved it, calling it "a charming, hyper-energetic, and wittily self-aware action comedy about gorgeous girls". Owen Gleiberman of Entertainment Weekly gave the film a B grade, with particular praise for Cameron Diaz's performance, saying "not just an Angel – that's a star". Peter Travers of Rolling Stone called the film a "guilty pleasure" and praised the wire work and fight choreography of Cheung-Yan Yuen. Travers was critical of the thin plot but said it is "the film's quirky sense of mischief, which sets it apart" from lesser television to film adaptations. Desson Howe of The Washington Post said "the gals are fab. And so's the movie". He expressed mild disappointment at the men, commenting that Murray is funnier than the role written for him, and that even though Tom Green "does his weirdest best" he is only mildly amusing.

Roger Ebert of the Chicago Sun-Times called it "a movie without a brain. Charlie's Angels is like the trailer for a video game movie, lacking only the video game, and the movie" and gave it half a star out of a possible 4 stars. Manohla Dargis wrote: "Of course, it's terrible – but did it have to be this bad?"
Mick LaSalle of the San Francisco Chronicle called it "an utter debacle" and said the film "makes the show look like the height of creativity, imagination and restraint". LaSalle blames director McG comparing the film to a trailer or music video. He was also critical of the deliberate decision to make the three women very similar, and says "the Angels' goofiness is a big disappointment, second only to the shocking ineptitude of McG".

Other responses 
During the making of Blade II, Guillermo del Toro commented that while films like Charlie's Angels had helped to popularize the wire fu style of fighting choreography in Western films, they also served as a "nail in the coffin" and prompted many filmmakers to want to get back to more "hard-hitting" action. In his commentary: "The moment you see Cameron Diaz flying in the air, and you know that she is incapable of flying in the air and kicking five guys... you realize that it is done using wires. [...] I mean, Charlie's Angels was great, but it[s fighting style] was almost satirical".

Home media
Charlie's Angels was released on both VHS and DVD on March 27, 2001 and on Blu-ray on August 3, 2010. It was then released on 4K Ultra HD Blu-ray on October 22, 2019.

Soundtrack
Charlie's Angels is the soundtrack album from the film of the same name. The album was released on October 24, 2000 by Columbia Records and Hollywood Records.

Other songs are not included in the soundtrack
 "All the Small Things" by Blink-182
 "Blind" by Korn
 "Live Wire" by Mötley Crüe
 "Wake Me Up Before You Go Go" by Wham!
 "Money (That's What I Want)" by The Flying Lizards
 "I Love Rock 'n' Roll" by Joan Jett and the Blackhearts
 "Angel of the Morning" by Juice Newton
 "Undercover Angel" by Alan O'Day
 "Principles of Lust" by Enigma
 "Twiggy Twiggy" by Pizzicato Five
 "Sukiyaki" by Kyu Sakamoto
 "Zendeko Hachijo" by Zenshuji Zendeko
 "Smack My Bitch Up" by The Prodigy
 "Another Town" by Transister
 "The Power of Love" by Huey Lewis and the News
 "Belly" by Nomad
 "When Angels Yodel" written and arranged by Frank Marocco
 "The Humpty Dance" by Digital Underground 
 “Baby Got Back” by Sir Mix-a-Lot
 "Miami Vice Theme" by Jan Hammer
 "Simon Says" by Pharoahe Monch
 "Leave You Far Behind" by Lunatic Calm
 "Skullsplitter" by Hednoize
 "Song 2" by Blur
 "Billie Jean" by Michael Jackson
 "Angel" by Rod Stewart

Year-end charts

Certifications

Sequels

A sequel called Charlie's Angels: Full Throttle released in 2003. Diaz, Barrymore and Liu reprised their roles, as did John Forsythe as the voice of Charlie in his last film role. Following Murray's departure from the franchise, Bernie Mac joined the cast as Jimmy Bosley, John's adoptive brother, while Demi Moore had a major role, and Jaclyn Smith reprised her role as Kelly Garrett from the original television series. The franchise was confirmed for a third and fourth film, but in 2004, the ideas were cancelled.

In 2015, Sony began the development on new Charlie's Angels installment. Elizabeth Banks directed and produced the film with her producing partner and husband Max Handelman. Initially developed as a reboot of the franchise, the film is a continuation of the original TV series and the McG-directed 2000s films.

The 2019 follow-up film starred Kristen Stewart, Naomi Scott and Ella Balinska as the new generation of Angels. Banks and Djimon Hounsou also starred as Charlie's assistants, known as Bosleys, while Patrick Stewart replaced Murray in the role of John Bosley and Jaclyn Smith reprised her role as Kelly Garrett for the second time for a cameo appearance. It was also the first installment to feature Robert Clotworthy as the voice of Charlie, replacing Forsythe following his death in 2010.

Accolades

References

External links

 
 
 
 

Charlie's Angels (franchise)
2000 films
2000 action comedy films
2000s buddy comedy films
2000s female buddy films
American action comedy films
American buddy comedy films
American female buddy films
American films about revenge
Columbia Pictures films
2000s English-language films
Films based on television series
Films directed by McG
Films produced by Drew Barrymore
Films scored by Edward Shearmur
Films set on airplanes
Films set in 2000
Films set in Los Angeles
Films shot in Los Angeles
Films with screenplays by Ed Solomon
Films with screenplays by John August
Flower Films films
2000 directorial debut films
2000 comedy films
2000s American films